Ludes is a commune in the Marne department in north-eastern France. Population (2017): 640.

See also
Communes of the Marne department
Montagne de Reims Regional Natural Park

References

Communes of Marne (department)